Jack Baymoore & the Bandits was a Swedish rockabilly group established by Jack Baymoore (aka Kent Vikmo), a rock vocalist in 1997. Prior to Jack Baymoore & the Bandits, Baymoore (Vikmo) had another band project Blackout where he had released with them Stop That Clock.

Baymoore has also made a number of tribute projects. Very notably he was in the Johnny Cash tribute band Tennessee Drifters. He also played tribute gigs singing Elvis Presley song and has appeared in a number of rockabilly compilations.

Members
Jack Baymoore – vocals
Antti Pihkanen – guitar
Jyrki "JJ" Juvonen – guitar and steel guitar
Jan Larsson – double bass
Tage Pihkanen – drums

Discography
Jack Baymoore & the Bandits

Blackout albums
1993: Stop That Clock

External links
Jack Baymoore Official website

Swedish musical groups
Rockabilly music groups